Deadline for My Memories is the debut solo album by Billie Ray Martin, former lead singer of the band Electribe 101. It was originally released in October 1995, including Martin's biggest hit single, "Your Loving Arms" and the notable follow-up, "Running Around Town".

Release history
The album was first released in Germany on CD in October 1995 and over the same period a vinyl version was released in the United Kingdom. The CD version was released in Australia also in late 1995 with the UK CD version being released January 1996. The United States and Canada CD versions were released in June 1996.

Single releases
"Your Loving Arms" was the first single released from the album, originally reaching number 38 in the UK Singles Chart in 1994, but it went on to reach number 6 when it was re-released the following year. It also peaked at number 46 on the US Billboard Hot 100. Four further singles were released from the album: "Running Around Town" (UK No. 29), "Imitation of Life" (No. 29), "Space Oasis" (No. 66), and "You & I (Keep Holding on)" (No. 76).

Critical reception

A reviewer from British magazine Music Week wrote, "The voice is smooth, the production slick and the demographic almost perfect – Annie Lennox meets Aretha Franklin in Nineties clubland."

Track listing

Singles

Personnel 
Billie Ray Martin – lead vocals, pedal steel, background vocals, producer, executive producer, vocal arrangement, string arrangements, mixing, photography, brass arrangement, make-up, stylist, vocal producer, melody arrangement
The Grid – producer, mixing
Andrew Fryer – programming, producer
Paul Gomersall – mixing
Greg Jackman – mixing
Volker Janssen – piano, keyboards
Dean Ross – keyboards
Brian Transeau – producer, mixing
Martin King – programming
Gary Barnacle (as Gary Barnickle) – string arrangements, brass arrangement, orchestra leader
B.J. Cole – pedal steel
Shawn Lee – guitar, drums
Luvaine Maximum – background vocals
The Phantom Horns – brass arrangement
Adrian Scarff – engineer, assistant engineer
Pete Schwier – engineer
Ren Swan – engineer, mixing
Nick Sykes – engineer
Gavyn Wright – orchestra leader

Charts

References

 

1995 debut albums
Billie Ray Martin albums
Sire Records albums
Magnet Records albums
Elektra Records albums
House music albums by German artists